Augusto José Schuster Picó or just Augusto Schuster or the mononym Schuster (born 24 August 1992, in Santiago) is a Chilean actor, singer, dancer and model.

Filmography

Telenovelas

TV series

Films

Theatre

Discography

Albums 
Solo
2017: Bonsai

Singles
2012: "Hello"
2014: "We Can Dance"
2015: "Llore"
2016: "Hasta el amanecer"
2017: "Me enamore"
2017: "¿Cómo se llama?"
2018: "You Love It"
2018: "Mi Regalo"
2019: "E.S.A" (with Izone)
2020: "Primera vez" (feat. Tommy Boysen)
2020: "No pasa nada"
2021: "Lo Repetimo (I Love Music)" (with Dr. Fifo)

featured in
2016: "Te Necesito" (Matt Hunter feat. Augusto Schuster)

Other releases
2007: Amango: El sueño se hizo realidad (from series Amango)
2007: Amango villancicos (from series Amango)
2008: Esto no es un juego (from series Amango)
2009: Química, el juego del amor (from series Química)
2009: Corazón Rebelde (from Corazón Rebelde)

DVDs
2007: Amango karaoke
2008: Amango: la gira
2008: Amango karaoke Esto No es un Juego
2008: Amango en vivo
2010: Crz la banda karaoke (from Corazón Rebelde)

Tours
 2007-2008: Amango Gira 2008
 2008: Soñar Despierto (for Amango)
 2009: CRZ - La Banda (for Corazón Rebelde

References

External links

Official website
Instagram
Twitter

21st-century Chilean male singers
Chilean male television actors
Chilean male telenovela actors
1992 births
Living people
People from Santiago